Sason sechellanum is a species of spider in the family Barychelidae, found in the Seychelles.

References

Barychelidae
Spiders of Africa
Spiders described in 1898